Presidential elections were held in Montenegro on 6 April 2008, the first after independence in 2006. The result was a victory for incumbent President Filip Vujanović, who received 52% of the vote.

Electoral system
The law on presidential elections was passed on 27 December 2007, requiring candidates to collect the signatures of 1.5% of registered voters in order to run.

Candidates

Democratic Party of Socialists
The ruling Democratic Party of Socialists nominated the current president of Montenegro, Filip Vujanović. He was supported by DPS' coalition partner,  the Social Democratic Party of Montenegro, as well as Croatian Civic Initiative, the Democratic Union of Albanians and the Democratic Community of Muslims Bosniacs in Montenegro.

Opposition
After proposals for a common candidate of the opposition failed, all opposition currents nominated their own Presidents as candidates.

Serb People's Party
Andrija Mandić, the leader of the Serb People's Party (SNS), was nominated as a common candidate of the Serb List (SL) political alliance. He held demonstrations in the nation's capital of Podgorica on 24 February 2008 against Kosovo's recent unilateral declaration of independence.

Movement for Changes
The Movement for Changes (PzP) nominated its leader Nebojša Medojević. Medojević was also supported by the Albanian Alternative (AA) and the FORCA. The AA, accusing DPS's regime of terror and disrespect of ethnic Albanians of Montenegro.

Socialist People's Party
The Socialist People's Party of Montenegro (SNP) chose Srđan Milić, leader of the party, as their candidate.

Other parties
The Bosniak Party decided, like two Albanian minority parties, to abstain from endorsing any candidate. The People's Party decided unanimously on 3 February 2008 that it would not participate in the election, but it supported the two opposition candidates that represent parties of the former pro-Serbian bloc.

Independents
Professor Blagota Mitrić of the Faculty of Law of University of Montenegro had announced that he would run for president, yet he did not manage to collect enough signatures to become an official candidate. This was also the case with Dragan Hajduković, an environmentalist who had been a regular participant in the previous presidential runs.

Vasilije Miličković, president of the Association of Minority Shareholders of the Montenegrin Electric Enterprise, had announced that he would run for president as an independent candidate only if the former president and prime minister Milo Đukanović also ran for that position.

Opinion polls
Polls and analysts claimed Vujanović would most surely win the largest number of votes and face-off with Medojevic in the second round. Since Vujanovic won over 50 percent of the vote in the first round there was no need for a runoff.

Results

References

Montenegro
President
Presidential elections in Montenegro
Montenegro